Bavnehøj-Hallen is an indoor sports arena in Copenhagen, Denmark primarily used for handball. The arena is home to Danish Handball League side Ajax Heroes.

Sports venues in Copenhagen
Handball venues in Denmark
Indoor arenas in Denmark
Vesterbro, Copenhagen